Promenaea is a genus of flowering plants from the orchid family, Orchidaceae. It contains 18 currently accepted species (including one that is apparently extinct), all endemic to Brazil.

Species 
Promenaea acuminata Schltr. 
Promenaea albescens Schltr. - São Paulo, Paraná
Promenaea catharinensis Schltr. - Santa Catarina
Promenaea dusenii Schltr. - Paraná
Promenaea fuerstenbergiana Schltr. - Santa Catarina
Promenaea guttata (Rchb.f.) Rchb.f.
Promenaea lentiginosa (Lindl.) Lindl.
Promenaea malmquistiana Schltr.†
Promenaea microptera Rchb.f.
Promenaea nigricans Königer & J.G.Weinm.bis - Paraná
Promenaea ovatiloba (Klinge) Cogn. in C.F.P.von Martius 
Promenaea paranaensis Schltr.  - Paraná
Promenaea riograndensis Schltr. - Rio Grande do Sul
Promenaea rollissonii (Lindl.) Lindl.
Promenaea silvana F.Barros & Cath. - Bahia
Promenaea sincorana P.Castro & Campacci - Bahia
Promenaea stapelioides (Link & Otto) Lindl.
Promenaea xanthina (Lindl.) Lindl.

Hybrids 
Hybrids of orchids in Promenaea with orchids in other genera are placed in the following nothogenera:
 Alantuckerara (Atc.) = Neogardneria × Promenaea × Zygopetalum
 Berlinerara (Brln.) = Aganisia × Batemannia × Otostylis × Promenaea × Zygopetalum × Zygosepalum
 Brianara (Brn.) = Galeottia × Pabstia × Promenaea × Zygopetalum
 Clowesetenaea (Cws.) = Catasetum × Clowesia × Promenaea
 Cymbidinaea (Cbn.) = Cymbidium × Promenaea
 Cyrtonaea (Ctea.) = Cyrtopodium × Promenaea
 Fisherara (Fsh.) = Neogardneria × Pabstia × Promenaea × Zygopetalum
 Galeomenetalum (Gle.) = Galeottia × Promenaea × Zygopetalum
 Hoosierara (Hos.) = Promenaea × Warrea × Zygopetalum
 Johnara (Jon.) = Cochleanthes × Pabstia × Promenaea × Zygopetalum
 Kanzerara (Kza.) = Chondrorhyncha × Promenaea × Zygopetalum
 Maccorquodaleara (Mcq.) = Aganisia × Batemannia × Cochleanthes × Otostylis × Pabstia × Promenaea × Zygopetalum × Zygosepalum
 Mauriceara (Mrc.) = Aganisia × Batemannia × Otostylis × Pabstia ×  Promenaea × Zygopetalum × Zygosepalum
 Miloara (Mlr.) = Miltonia × Pabstia × Promenaea × Zygopetalum
 Procaste (Prte.) = Lycaste × Promenaea
 Prochaea (Poha.) = Dichaea × Promenaea
 Promadisanthus (Pmds.) = Paradisanthus × Promenaea
 Promarrea (Pmar.) = Promenaea × Warrea
 Promcidium (Pcd.) = Oncidium × Promenaea
 Promellia (Pmla.) = Ansellia × Promenaea
 Promenabstia (Pmb.) = Pabstia × Promenaea
 Promenanthes (Prths.) = Cochleanthes × Promenaea
 Promenopsis (Pmp.) = Eriopsis × Promenaea
 Promenzella (Pmz.) = Promenaea × Warczewiczella
 Promoglossum (Pgl.) = Promenaea × Rossioglossum
 Promosepalum (Prsm.) = Promenaea × Zygosepalum
 Propabstopetalum (Pbt.) = Pabstia × Promenaea × Zygopetalum
 Propescapetalum (Pop.) = Pescatoria × Promenaea × Zygopetalum
 Propetalum (Pptm.) = Promenaea × Zygopetalum
 Robinstevensara (Rsv.) = Cochleanthes × Promenaea × Zygopetalum
 Rosstuckerara (Rsk.) = Aganisia × Batemannia × Otostylis × Pabstia × Promenaea × Warczewiczella × Zygopetalum × Zygosepalum
 Warszewiczara (Wwz.) = Pabstia × Promenaea × Warczewiczella × Zygopetalum
 Williampriceara (Wmp.) = Anguloa × Lycaste × Pabstia × Promenaea × Zygopetalum
 Zygomenzella (Zmz.) = Promenaea × Warczewiczella × Zygopetalum

See also 
 List of Orchidaceae genera

References

External links 
 
 

Endemic orchids of Brazil
Zygopetalinae genera
Zygopetalinae